Martha Klein is a philosopher, specialising in the intersection of the philosophy of mind and moral philosophy, and especially in the question of the freedom of the will.

After a period as lecturer in philosophy at Christ Church, Oxford, Klein was elected a Fellow of Pembroke College, Oxford; she retired in 2006. Her research interests are in free will, moral responsibility and moral psychology.

Publications
Determinism, Blameworthiness, and Deprivation (1990; Oxford:Clarendon Press. )
"Morality and Justice in Kant" (1990: in Ratio)
"Externalism, Content, and Causation" (1996: in Proceedings of the Aristotelian Society)
"Free Will" (1998: in A. Montefiore & V. Muresan (edd) British Moral Philosophy; published in Romania as "Libertatea vointea" in Filosofia Morala Britanica, 1998)
"Praise and Blame" (1998: in E. Craig (ed.) Routledge Encyclopedia of Philosophy Volume VII)

References

External links
Martha Klein — Pembroke College web page

British women philosophers
Philosophers of mind
Year of birth missing (living people)
Living people
Fellows of Pembroke College, Oxford
20th-century British philosophers
Moral psychology